Anthomyiopsis plagioderae is a European species of flies in the family Tachinidae.

References

Tachininae
Muscomorph flies of Europe
Insects described in 1972